Jakob Prandtauer (baptized in Stanz bei Landeck (Tyrol) on 16 July 1660; died in Sankt Pölten on 16 September 1726) was an Austrian Baroque architect.

Trained as a stonemason rather than as an architect, he designed and supervised the construction of the church of Melk Abbey, in Melk, Lower Austria. He was the uncle of Josef Munggenast, who inherited his business and continued his style.

References

Bibliography 
 
 Huberta Weigl, Prandtauer, Jakob. In Allgemeines Künstlerlexikon. Die Bildenden Künstler aller Zeiten und Völker (AKL). Vol. 96, de Gruyter, Berlin 2017, .
 Hugo Hantsch, Jakob Prandtauer. Der Klosterarchitekt des österreichischen Barock, Vienna 1926.
 Huberta Weigl, Jakob Prandtauer 1660–1726. Baumeister des Barock (Studien zur internationalen Architektur- und Kunstgeschichte, Band 183), Michael Imhof Verlag, Petersberg 2021, .dnb.de

External links 

Austrian Baroque architects
People from Sankt Pölten
1660 births
1726 deaths